Phantasm II is a 1988 American science fantasy action-horror film and the sequel to Phantasm (1979). It was written and directed by Don Coscarelli and stars Angus Scrimm, James LeGros and Reggie Bannister. The first film's protagonist, Mike, recently released from a mental institution, recruits Reggie and some new friends in an effort to defeat the villain Tall Man.

The film caused controversy among fans by recasting main character Mike with LeGros, and was not well received by critics. It was followed by two direct-to-video sequels: Phantasm III: Lord of the Dead (1994) and Phantasm IV: Oblivion (1998) as well as the final film in the Phantasm series: Phantasm: Ravager (2016), which received a theatrical release. Following distribution problems in the U.S., Phantasm II was released in Region 1 on DVD in 2009 and Blu-ray disc in 2013.

Plot
Liz Reynolds is a young woman whose psychic bond to Mike Pearson and the Tall Man manifests in the form of prophetic nightmares. Liz pleads for Mike to find her, as she fears that when her grandfather dies, the Tall Man will take him. The scene then transitions where the first film left off, the Tall Man and his minions attempt to kidnap Mike but Reggie manages to save him by blowing up the house.

In 1986, after being institutionalized for seven years, Mike, now 19, has faked his recovery to get released. That night he returns to Morningside Cemetery where he proceeds to dig up graves. Reggie interrupts him and explains that what happened in 1978 and the Tall Man were not real. In response, Mike reveals all the coffins he exhumed are empty and urges Reggie to help him hunt down the Tall Man. En route to Reggie's house, Mike has a premonition and frantically tries to warn Reggie seconds before an explosion kills Reggie's entire family.  Convinced by Mike's precognition, Reggie agrees to accompany Mike. They break into a hardware store and stock up on supplies and weapons. Traveling north-western country roads, they encounter abandoned towns, pillaged graveyards, and a few of the Tall Man's traps; one is the apparition of a young woman's naked corpse. A gruesome encounter with a creature resembling Liz leads them to travel east towards the town of Perigord, Oregon.

Meanwhile, Liz's grandfather dies, and her sister Jeri disappears during the funeral; while searching for Jeri, Liz finds the Tall Man and flees. The presiding priest, Father Meyers, maddened with fear and alcoholism, desecrates the grandfather's body with a knife in a desperate attempt to thwart its reanimation, but the corpse rises and kidnaps Liz's grandmother. In the morning, Liz finds a funeral pin in her grandmother's empty bed, and the Tall Man psychically tells Liz to return at night if she wants to rescue her grandmother. Prior to their arrival in Perigord, Mike awakens to find that Reggie has picked up a hitchhiker named Alchemy who eerily resembles the nude apparition. They find Perigord deserted and dilapidated. When Liz arrives at the mortuary, she is confronted by Father Meyers, who tries to convince her to escape with him, but he is killed by a flying sphere. She encounters the Tall Man and discovers that her grandmother is now one of his Lurkers; she flees and runs into Mike in the cemetery. Later that night, the Tall Man captures Liz and drives away in his hearse; Mike and Reggie chase after him. After the Tall Man runs them off the road, their car explodes.

At the crematorium, Liz is taken to the furnace room by the Tall Man's mortician assistants, but she escapes and sends one into the furnace. Mike and Reggie break into the mortuary and find the embalming room. While Reggie pours acid into the embalming fluid, Mike discovers a dimensional portal that requires a sphere to open. They then split up to find Liz. Reggie searches the basement, where he fights off a Graver and several Lurkers with a chainsaw and quadruple shotgun. After a vicious fight Reggie castrates the Graver to death and guns down the Lurkers. Mike saves Liz from a silver sphere which drills itself through the other mortician's hand, embedding him to the wall. A larger, gold sphere emerges and begins to chase Mike and Liz. Meanwhile, the other mortician's assistant chops his own hand off to escape the wall. Dodging the gold sphere's upgraded arsenal such as scanners lasers, and spinning blades, Mike and Liz manage to hold off the attack by barricading themselves in the parlor after the sentinel rammed through multiple doors. The mortician assistant surprisingly returns and almost kills Liz before the gold sphere blasts through the door and drills its way into his back and up his throat with a buzz saw. Liz, Mike, and Reggie reunite and use the still embedded silver sphere to access the portal. Before they can destroy the building, the Tall Man surprises them, but they fight him off and pump him full of the acid-contaminated embalming fluid, which causes him to melt. They set the building on fire, escape, and are greeted by Alchemy, who has procured an abandoned hearse.

As they ride off, Alchemy reveals herself to not be human, and the hearse swerves wildly, then stops. Reggie, bloody and battered, falls to the ground; Mike and Liz, trapped in the hearse, try to convince themselves that this is all just a dream, but the slot to the driver's cabin opens and reveals the Tall Man, who tells them, "No, it's not." Hands break the rear window and pull Mike and Liz through it, mirroring the ending of the first film.

Cast
 Angus Scrimm as The Tall Man
 James LeGros as Mike Pearson
 Reggie Bannister as Reggie
 Paula Irvine as Liz Reynolds
 Samantha Phillips as Alchemy
 Kenneth Tigar as Father Meyers
 Rubin Kushner as Grandpa Alex Murphy
 Ruth C. Engel as Grandma Murphy
 Stacey Travis as Jeri Reynolds
 A. Michael Baldwin as Young Mike
 J. Patrick McNamara as Psychologist
 Mark Anthony Major as Mortician

Themes
John Kenneth Muir states that, like many horror films of the 1980s, Phantasm II shifted its focus to guns.  Sequels in the 1980s were required to be bigger, gorier, and have more firepower than previous installments.  The theme of "bigger is better" means that everything is upgraded: a quadruple shotgun, golden spheres with increased weaponry, a chainsaw duel, and the nature of the Tall Man's death.  Muir states that the narrative of a boy dealing with the loss of his family is unchanged, but it is approached differently: instead of the surrealism of Phantasm, it is approached in a conventional, less abstract manner.

Production
Writer-director Don Coscarelli says that he had been under pressure to film a sequel but could not come up with a story. Coscarelli considered the first film's ending to be conclusive, and did not feel knowledgeable about writing sequels, but he had what he described as a breakthrough when he realized he could start the film immediately after the previous film's final scene. He also added a road movie element in how Reggie and Mike combat the Tall Man, after which he described the process as straightforward. Universal Studios, who took an interest in the film because they wanted a horror series, allocated three million dollars; this was the lowest budget of any of their films in the 1980s, but it was the highest budget of any Phantasm film. Greg Nicotero and Robert Kurtzman, later of K.N.B. EFX, were recruited for special effects.  The studio exerted much control over the film, and they did not allow Coscarelli to include any dream sequences or ambiguity.

This is the only installment in the Phantasm series that does not include the entire original main cast (Bill Thornbury and his character did not appear in this film), and the only one to re-cast a main character with another actor.  Universal forced Coscarelli to recast the character of Mike, as they wanted a working actor.  In an interview, Bannister said that LeGros' casting was initially controversial among hardcore fans but has become more accepted. Brad Pitt auditioned for the role of Mike Pearson.

Release
Phantasm II was released theatrically on July 8, 1988, and played on 1227 screens.  It was later characterized by Pat H. Broeske of the Los Angeles Times as a box office bomb.  The film was later released by Universal Home Entertainment on VHS.  A Region 1 DVD was released by Universal on September 15, 2009. Shout! Factory released a new collector's edition DVD and Blu-ray release under their sub-label "Scream Factory" on March 26, 2013. Both the DVD and Blu-ray contain audio commentary with Don Coscarelli, Angus Scrimm and Reggie Banister, new interviews, deleted scenes, and more.  The film was played at the Phantasm-ania festival in February 2013.

Reception
On Rotten Tomatoes, 38% of 16 surveyed critics gave the film a positive review, and the average rating is 4.80/10. On Metacritic the film has a score of 42% based on reviews from 9 critics, indicating "mixed or average reviews".

In a negative review, Roger Ebert rated the film one out of four stars and likened it to an extended dream without logic or a coherent plot, full of nightmarish images and no character development.  Time Out also said that "the only valid reason for seeing this belated sequel is that it goes some way towards explaining the incomprehensible plot of its predecessor." Variety called the film "an utterly unredeeming, full-gore sequel" and  "incredibly morbid and meaningless".  Carrie Rickey of the Philadelphia Inquirer described the film as "a series of apparently unrelated horrors visited upon good-looking blond people" and criticized the gore.   Roger Hurlburt of the Sun-Sentinel criticized LeGros' acting and called the film a waste of time.  Writing in The New York Times, Caryn James stated that "there are some grotesquely stylish and scary moments" but they "seem to take as long to arrive as the sequel did."  Kevin Thomas of the Los Angeles Times called the film "a fast, entertaining fright show" but needlessly literal and gratuitous, as the film series transforms from a surreal thriller to a trite horror film.  In a positive review, Dave Kehr of the Chicago Tribune stated that "Coscarelli has captured the texture of a disjointed, half-remembered nightmare" and likens it to the 1920s surrealist film movement.  The Philadelphia Daily News Amy Alexander said the film "has all the elements of a classic serial horror film" and praised the special effects.

Some critics reviewed the film on home video.  Scott Weinberg of Fearnet called the Phantasm sequels indecipherable and too weird to understand, though he recommends Phantasm II to fans of the original.  Scott Tobias of The A.V. Club rated the film a B and wrote of the cult appeal.  Matt Serafini of Dread Central rated the film four out of five but criticized the more realistic approach taken in favor of the surrealism of the first film. Bloody Disgusting rated the film three-and-a-half out of five, but said that the film seems dated now and does not quite live up to its nostalgic value.  Andy Klein of the Glendale News-Press cited the film's weirdness and creepiness as making up for breaking the rules of what makes a good horror film.  Marco Lanzagorta of PopMatters rated it ten out of ten stars and wrote, "The narrative of Phantasm II may sound absurd and ridiculous, but the feelings of dread and anxiety that we get while we watch it are very real." UGO included Phantasm II in its list of Surprisingly Decent Horror Sequels and called it a "sturdy continuation".

Sources

External links

 
 
 
 
 

1988 films
1988 horror films
1988 fantasy films
1980s science fiction horror films
American fantasy films
American science fiction horror films
American independent films
American action horror films
American supernatural horror films
American sequel films
Universal Pictures films
Films directed by Don Coscarelli
Grave-robbing in film
Phantasm (franchise)
1980s English-language films
1980s American films